Samuel Moorhouse Crossland (16 August 1851 – 11 April 1906) was an English first-class cricketer, who played four  matches for Yorkshire County Cricket Club between 1883 and 1886.

Born in Leeds, Yorkshire, England, Crossland was a wicket-keeper, who took three catches and completed five stumpings.  He scored 32 runs as a right hand lower order batsman, with a best of 20 against Kent, at an average of 8.00.

His father, Andrew Crossland, had played in eight first-class matches for Yorkshire (before the formation of the County Championship) from 1844 to 1855.

Samuel Crossland died in April 1906 in Wakefield, Yorkshire.

References

External links
Cricinfo Profile
Cricket Archive Statistics

1851 births
1906 deaths
Cricketers from Leeds
Yorkshire cricketers
Wicket-keepers